Reinmar is a German masculine given name. It comes from Germanic *ragin/regin ("resolution [of the gods]") and Old High German mari, ("famous").

Variant forms of the name include Ragnomar, Raginmar, Ragnimir, Raginmir, and Reginmar.

People with the name Reinmar

 Reinmar von Brennenberg (13th century), German minnesinger
 Reinmar von Hagenau also the Elder (13th century), German minnesinger
 Reinmar von Zweter (13th century), German minnesinger
 Reinmar of Bielawa, fictional character by Andrzej Sapkowski